2006 Maryland General Assembly election may refer to:

2006 Maryland Senate election
2006 Maryland House of Delegates election